Travis Montague Dowlin (born 24 February 1977) is a Guyanese former cricketer who represented Guyana, West Indies A and the West Indies in Tests, One Day Internationals and Twenty20 Internationals. He was a right-handed batsman and part-time off break bowler.

International recognition

On 13 January 2007 he was named in the 30-man provisional squad for the 2007 Cricket World Cup but was not selected in the final squad of 15.

International selection

Dowlin made his Test debut on 9 July 2009. He was part of an under-strength team fielded by the West Indies against Bangladesh; the 15-man squad included nine uncapped players and seven West Indies players made their Test debut in the match. The side was captained by Floyd Reifer who had played the last of his four Tests ten years earlier. The first XI had made themselves unavailable due to a pay dispute with the West Indies Cricket Board.

After scoring an unbeaten century against Bangladesh in just his second ODI at Roseau, Dowlin was also named in an understrength squad that travelled to South Africa to compete in the 2009 ICC Champions Trophy and played all three matches as the West Indies exited the competition at the group stage.

Dowlin subsequently kept his place in the West Indian squad for the tour to Australia, where he played in the first and third Tests in Brisbane and Perth.

His wicket was taken by MS Dhoni in the 2009 ICC Champions Trophy, Dhoni's only wicket in international cricket.

References

External links

1977 births
Sportspeople from Georgetown, Guyana
West Indies Test cricketers
West Indies One Day International cricketers
West Indies Twenty20 International cricketers
Guyanese cricketers
Guyana cricketers
Living people